Viburnum recognitum, variously called the northern arrowwood, southern arrowwood, and smooth arrow-wood, is a species of flowering plant in the family Viburnaceae. It is native to eastern Canada, and the central and eastern United States. A shrub or small shrubby tree, they are typically found in wetter habitats such as stream banks, bottomlands, swamps, and mesic woodlands. It is closely related to, and may be a subtaxon of, Viburnum dentatum, the southern arrowwood or roughish arrowwood.

References

recognitum
Flora of Ontario
Flora of Quebec
Flora of New Brunswick
Flora of Nova Scotia
Flora of Texas
Flora of Missouri
Flora of Illinois
Flora of Wisconsin
Flora of the Southeastern United States
Flora of the Northeastern United States
Plants described in 1941
Flora without expected TNC conservation status